Shinkyoku are modern musical compositions for shakuhachi.  The term is commonly used to describe early post-Meiji era compositions influenced by western music.

See also
 Honkyoku (traditional, solo shakuhachi compositions)
 Sankyoku (ensemble compositions, for shakuhachi, koto and shamisen)

External links
 Shinkyoku discography at the International Shakuhachi Society

Japanese traditional music